Gently Weeps is the fifth U.S. solo album by ukulele artist Jake Shimabukuro, released in September 2006 on the Hitchhike Records label. In Japan the album was released on June 19, 2006 by Sony Music Distribution, with 17 tracks, many of which differed from the U.S. release, and additional bonus tracks on a CD-ROM.

Awards and reviews
Gently Weeps peaked at #2 on Billboard'''s Top World Music Albums in 2006. The album won the 2007 Na Hoku Hanohano Award for Instrumental Album of the Year.

AllMusic's review of Gently Weeps noted that:

John Diliberto's review of the album included the following synopsis:

Track listing
All tracks composed by Jake Shimabukuro except where noted.
"While My Guitar Gently Weeps" (George Harrison) - 4:07
"Ave Maria" (Franz Schubert) - 3:02
"Wish On My Star" - 3:49
"Sakura" (Traditional Japanese folk song) - 2:56
"The Star-Spangled Banner" (John Stafford Smith) - 2:12
"Let's Dance"  - 2:46
"Misty" (Johnny Burke, Erroll Garner) - 3:38
"Spain" (Chick Corea) - 2:53
"Heartbeat/Dragon"  - 4:00
"Blue Roses Falling"  - 3:40
"Grandma's Groove"  - 2:11
"Breathe"  - 3:43

Bonus tracks
"Angel"  - 4:03
"Lazy Jane"  - 3:57
"Hula Girl" (Theme song of the film Hula Girls)  - 3:44
"Beyond The Break" (Music for the TV network THE N "Beyond the Break")  - 3:03
"Wish On My Star" (vocal version for the movie Hula Girls'') - 3:31

Personnel

Musical
Jake Shimabukuro - ukulele, producer  
Michael Grande - keyboards  
Bobby Ingano - guitar (steel)  
Yasuharu Nakanishi - piano  
Takashi Nishiumi - guitar  
Hiroyuki Noritake - drums  
Jack Ofoia - bass guitar, guitar  
Akira Okazawa - bass guitar  
Noel Okimoto - drums  
Jon F. Porlas, Jr. - percussion  
Vernon Sakata - guitar (electric)  
Dean Taba - bass guitar
Darin Enomoto - drums

Technical
Mac McAnally - producer
Alan Schulman - engineer  
Chris Stone - engineer  
Takaoki Saito - engineer

References

External links
Gently Weeps on AllMusic
Gently Weeps at Amazon
 – April 2006 viral video on YouTube
Biography of Jake Shimbukuro at Billboard

Jake Shimabukuro albums
2006 albums
Na Hoku Hanohano Award-winning albums